"Get Me Off" is a song by British electronic music duo Basement Jaxx. The song was originally intended for Janet Jackson after she contacted the duo to collaborate for her seventh album, All for You. "Get Me Off" was released on 17 June 2002 as the fourth single from their second studio album, Rooty (2001). The song reached number 22 in the United Kingdom, number 43 in Australia, and number 47 in Ireland. It is their only single from 1996 to 2005 that wasn't included on their greatest hits album, The Singles (2005).

Background
Upon expressing admiration for the Basement Jaxx's debut album Remedy, Janet Jackson contacted the duo to collaborate. Jackson was offered the song for the album, though declined. "She told us she loved our stuff," recalls Buxton, "but she thought we were Zero 7. We wished her every success in hooking up with a British dance duo eventually and said, 'Cheerio, Celine.'"

Chart performance
"Get Me Off" debuted and peaked at number 22 on the UK Singles Chart before falling to number 34 in its second week. The song spent a total of three weeks in the Top 75. The song also reached the top 50 in Australia and Ireland.

Track listings

Charts

Weekly charts

Year-end charts

Covers and remixes
Canadian electronic musician Peaches included her remix of "Get Me Off" as a bonus track for her album Fatherfucker.

References

2001 songs
2002 singles
Astralwerks singles
Basement Jaxx songs
Peaches (musician) songs
Songs written by Felix Buxton
Songs written by Simon Ratcliffe (musician)
XL Recordings singles